A Christmas Symphony was a Christmas-themed concert tour by British soprano singer Sarah Brightman. It consisted of 17 shows in the United States from November and December 2021. Brightman was accompanied by an orchestra and a choir and the program included renditions of classics from the Christmas canon, holiday favorites, and her greatest hits. The first Sarah Brightman show named A Christmas Symphony was in fact recorded in December 2020 in London.

Set list 
ACT 1
 The Nutcracker Overture 
 Ave Maria
 Better is One Day
 Walking in The Air 
 O Holy Night 
 Hijo de la Luna
 Follow Me
 Jesu, Joy of Man's Desiring
 Coventry Carol 
 Winter Light
 Arrival
 Nessun Dorma

ACT 2
 Hymn Overture
 Hymn
 Sogni 
 Have Your Self A Merry Little Christmas 
 Colder Than Winter
 Silent Night
 I Believe in Father Christmas
 Pie Jesu
 Nutcracker Interlude 
 Masquerade 
 The Phantom of the Opera 
 Time to Say Goodbye

Encore
 Amazing Grace 
 Happy Christmas

Tour Dates

References 

2021 concert tours
2022 concert tours
Sarah Brightman concert tours
Concert tours of North America
Concert tours of the United States
Concert tours of Asia